Below is a chronological listing of the United States senators from Massachusetts. According to the Seventeenth Amendment to the United States Constitution adopted in 1913, U.S. senators are popularly elected for a six-year term. Elections are held the first Tuesday after November 1, and terms begin on January 3, about two months after the vote. Before 1914, and the enforcement of the Seventeenth Amendment, the state's U.S. senators were chosen by the Massachusetts General Court, and before 1935, their terms began March 4.

The current senators are Democrats Elizabeth Warren and Ed Markey. Ted Kennedy was Massachusetts's longest-serving senator, serving from 1962 until his death in 2009.

Mid-term vacancy appointment processes
Through the 20th century, mid-term vacancies were filled with the governor's appointee, with the appointment expiring at the next biennial state election. In 2004, the Democratic-controlled state legislature changed the vacancy-filling process, mandating that a special election occur, which removed the governor's appointment power. This statute was enacted over the veto by the governor, Mitt Romney. The leadership of the Massachusetts legislature at the time was concerned that the Republican Governor Mitt Romney would appoint a Republican if Democratic Senator John Kerry were elected president of the United States in the 2004 election. Generally, the law requires a special election within 145 to 160 days from the date of the filing of a Senate resignation. The law contemplates resignations that become effective some period of time after the filing of the resignation, so long as the election occurs after effective date of the resignation.

While terminally ill with brain cancer, Ted Kennedy requested that the Massachusetts legislature change the law to allow an interim appointment. Kennedy died shortly thereafter, and the legislature quickly passed a bill providing for an interim appointment. On September 24, 2009, Governor Deval Patrick signed the bill, and appointed Paul G. Kirk, who had previously served as one of Kennedy's congressional aides and as chairman of the Democratic National Committee.

List of senators

|- style="height:2em"
! 1
| align=left | Tristram Dalton
|  | Pro-Admin.
| Mar 4, 1789 –Mar 3, 1791
| Elected in 1788.Lost re-election.
| 1
| 
| rowspan=2 | 1
| rowspan=2 | Elected in 1788.
| rowspan=4 nowrap | Mar 4, 1789 –Jun 1, 1796
| rowspan=3  | Pro-Admin.
| rowspan=4 align=right | Caleb Strong
! rowspan=4 | 1

|- style="height:2em"
! rowspan=3 | 2
| rowspan=3 align=left | George Cabot
| rowspan=2  | Pro-Admin.
| rowspan=3 nowrap | Mar 4, 1791 –Jun 9, 1796
| rowspan=3 | Elected in 1790.Resigned.
| rowspan=5 | 2
| 

|- style="height:2em"
| 
| rowspan=5 | 2
| rowspan=2 | Re-elected in 1793.Resigned.

|- style="height:2em"
|  | Federalist
| rowspan=3 
|  | Federalist

|- style="height:2em"
| colspan=3 | Vacant
| Jun 9, 1796 –Jun 11, 1796
| Vacant
| Vacant
| Jun 1, 1796 –Jun 11, 1796
| colspan=3 | Vacant

|- style="height:2em"
! rowspan=5 | 3
| rowspan=5 align=left | Benjamin Goodhue
| rowspan=5  | Federalist
| rowspan=5 nowrap | Jun 11, 1796 –Nov 8, 1800
| Elected to finish Cabot's term.
| rowspan=2 | Elected to finish Strong's term.Retired to run for the U.S. House of Representatives.
| rowspan=2 nowrap | Jun 11, 1796 –Mar 3, 1799
| rowspan=2  | Federalist
| rowspan=2 align=right | Theodore Sedgwick
! rowspan=2 | 2

|- style="height:2em"
| rowspan=4 | Also elected to full term in 1796.Resigned.
| rowspan=8 | 3
| 

|- style="height:2em"
| rowspan=5 
| rowspan=8 | 3
| Elected in 1798.Resigned to become U.S. Secretary of War.
| Mar 4, 1799 –May 30, 1800
|  | Federalist
| align=right | Samuel Dexter
! 3

|- style="height:2em"
| Vacant
| May 31, 1800 –Jun 5, 1800
| colspan=3 | Vacant

|- style="height:2em"
| rowspan=4 | Elected to finish Dexter's term.Resigned.
| rowspan=4 nowrap | Jun 6, 1800 –Mar 3, 1803
| rowspan=4  | Federalist
| rowspan=4 align=right | Dwight Foster
! rowspan=4 | 4

|- style="height:2em"
| colspan=3 | Vacant
| Nov 8, 1800 –Nov 14, 1800
| Vacant

|- style="height:2em"
! rowspan=3 | 4
| rowspan=3 align=left | Jonathan Mason
| rowspan=3  | Federalist
| rowspan=3 nowrap | Nov 14, 1800 –Mar 3, 1803
| rowspan=3 | Elected to finish Goodhue's term.

|- style="height:2em"
| rowspan=2 

|- style="height:2em"
| Vacant
| Mar 2, 1803 –Mar 3, 1803
| colspan=3 | Vacant

|- style="height:2em"
! rowspan=3 | 5
| rowspan=3 align=left | John Quincy Adams
| rowspan=3  | Federalist
| rowspan=3 nowrap | Mar 4, 1803 –Jun 8, 1808
| rowspan=3 | Elected in 1803.Resigned, having lost re-election to the next term.
| rowspan=4 | 4
| 
| Elected to finish Foster's term.
| rowspan=5 nowrap | Mar 4, 1803 –Mar 3, 1811
| rowspan=5  | Federalist
| rowspan=5 align=right | Timothy Pickering
! rowspan=5 | 5

|- style="height:2em"
| 
| rowspan=4 | 4
| rowspan=4 | Re-elected in 1805.Lost re-election.

|- style="height:2em"
| rowspan=2 

|- style="height:2em"
! rowspan=5 | 6
| rowspan=5 align=left | James Lloyd
| rowspan=5  | Federalist
| rowspan=5 nowrap | Jun 9, 1808 –May 1, 1813
| Elected to finish Adams's term, having already been elected to the next term.

|- style="height:2em"
| rowspan=4 | Elected in 1808.Resigned.
| rowspan=6 | 5
| 

|- style="height:2em"
| rowspan=2 
| rowspan=8 | 5
| State Senate failed to elect.
| nowrap | Mar 4, 1811 –Jun 28, 1811
| colspan=3 | Vacant

|- style="height:2em"
| rowspan=7 | Elected in 1811, to finish the vacant term.Retired or lost re-election.
| rowspan=7 nowrap | Jun 29, 1811 –Mar 3, 1817
| rowspan=7  | Democratic-Republican
| rowspan=7 align=right | Joseph Bradley Varnum
! rowspan=7 | 6

|- style="height:2em"
| rowspan=3 

|- style="height:2em"
| colspan=3 | Vacant
| May 1, 1813 –May 5, 1813
| Vacant

|- style="height:2em"
! rowspan=2 | 7
| rowspan=2 align=left | Christopher Gore
| rowspan=2  | Federalist
| rowspan=2 nowrap | May 5, 1813 –May 30, 1816
| Appointed to finish Lloyd's term.

|- style="height:2em"
| Elected to full term in 1815.Resigned.
| rowspan=9 | 6
| rowspan=3 

|- style="height:2em"
| colspan=3 | Vacant
| May 31, 1816 –Jun 11, 1816
| Vacant

|- style="height:2em"
! rowspan=2 | 8
| rowspan=2 align=left | Eli P. Ashmun
| rowspan=2  | Federalist
| rowspan=2 nowrap | Jun 12, 1816 –May 10, 1818
| rowspan=2 | Elected to finish Gore's term.Resigned.

|- style="height:2em"
| rowspan=3 
| rowspan=9 | 6
| rowspan=7 | Elected in 1816.Resigned to run for Mayor of Boston.
| rowspan=7 nowrap | Mar 4, 1817 –May 30, 1822
| rowspan=7  | Federalist
| rowspan=7 align=right | Harrison Gray Otis
! rowspan=7 | 7

|- style="height:2em"
| colspan=3 | Vacant
| nowrap | May 11, 1818 –Jun 4, 1818
| Vacant

|- style="height:2em"
! rowspan=2 | 9
| rowspan=2 align=left | Prentiss Mellen
| rowspan=2  | Federalist
| rowspan=2 nowrap | Jun 5, 1818 –May 15, 1820
| rowspan=2 | Elected to finish Ashmun's term.Resigned to become Chief Justice of Maine.

|- style="height:2em"
| rowspan=3 

|- style="height:2em"
| colspan=3 | Vacant
| nowrap | May 16, 1820 –Jun 12, 1820
| Vacant

|- style="height:2em"
! rowspan=8 | 10
| rowspan=8 align=left | Elijah H. Mills
| rowspan=5  | Federalist
| rowspan=8 nowrap | Jun 12, 1820 –Mar 3, 1827
| Elected to finish Mellen's term.

|- style="height:2em"
| rowspan=7 | Re-elected in 1820.Lost re-election in 1826.
| rowspan=7 | 7
| rowspan=3 

|- style="height:2em"
| Vacant
| nowrap | May 30, 1822 –Jun 5, 1822
| colspan=3 | Vacant

|- style="height:2em"
| Elected to finish Otis's term.
| rowspan=3 nowrap | Jun 5, 1822 –May 23, 1826
| rowspan=2  | Federalist
| rowspan=3 align=right | James Lloyd
! rowspan=3 | 8

|- style="height:2em"
| 
| rowspan=6 | 7
| rowspan=2 | Re-elected in 1822.Resigned.

|- style="height:2em"
| rowspan=3  | NationalRepublican
| rowspan=3 
|  | NationalRepublican

|- style="height:2em"
| Vacant
| nowrap | May 23, 1826 –May 31, 1826
| colspan=3 | Vacant

|- style="height:2em"
| rowspan=3 | Elected to finish Lloyd's term.
| rowspan=6 nowrap | May 31, 1826 –Mar 3, 1835
| rowspan=6  | NationalRepublican
| rowspan=6 align=right| Nathaniel Silsbee
! rowspan=6 | 9

|- style="height:2em"
| colspan=3 | Vacant
| nowrap | Mar 4, 1827 – Jun 8, 1827
| Vacant
| rowspan=4 | 8
| rowspan=2 

|- style="height:2em"
! rowspan=9 | 11
| rowspan=9 align=left | Daniel Webster
| rowspan=5  | NationalRepublican
| rowspan=9 nowrap | Jun 8, 1827 –Feb 22, 1841
| rowspan=3 | Elected late in 1827.

|- style="height:2em"
| 
| rowspan=3 | 8
| rowspan=3 | Re-elected in 1828.Retired.

|- style="height:2em"
| 

|- style="height:2em"
| rowspan=3 | Re-elected in 1833.
| rowspan=3 | 9
| 

|- style="height:2em"
| 
| rowspan=6 | 9
| rowspan=3 | Elected in 1835.Resigned to become Governor of Massachusetts.
| rowspan=3 nowrap | Mar 4, 1835 –Jan 5, 1841
|  | NationalRepublican
| rowspan=3 align=right | John Davis
! rowspan=3 | 10

|- style="height:2em"
| rowspan=4  | Whig
| 
| rowspan=2  | Whig

|- style="height:2em"
| rowspan=3 | Re-elected in 1839.Resigned to become U.S. Secretary of State.
| rowspan=6 | 10
| rowspan=4 

|- style="height:2em"
| Vacant
| nowrap | Jan 5, 1841 –Jan 13, 1841
| colspan=3 | Vacant

|- style="height:2em"
| rowspan=2 | Elected to finish Davis's term.
| rowspan=5 nowrap | Jan 13, 1841 –Mar 16, 1845
| rowspan=5  | Whig
| rowspan=5 align=right | Isaac C. Bates
! rowspan=5 | 11

|- style="height:2em"
! rowspan=3 | 12
| rowspan=3 align=left | Rufus Choate
| rowspan=3  | Whig
| rowspan=3 nowrap | Feb 23, 1841 –Mar 3, 1845
| rowspan=3 | Elected to finish Webster's term.Retired.

|- style="height:2em"
| 
| rowspan=5 | 10
| rowspan=3 | Elected to full term in 1841.Died.

|- style="height:2em"
| 

|- style="height:2em"
! rowspan=5 | 13
| rowspan=5 align=left | Daniel Webster
| rowspan=5  | Whig
| rowspan=5 nowrap | Mar 4, 1845 –Jul 22, 1850
| rowspan=5 | Elected in 1845.Resigned to become U.S. Secretary of State again.
| rowspan=8 | 11
| rowspan=3 

|- style="height:2em"
| Vacant
| nowrap | Mar 16, 1845 –Mar 24, 1845
| colspan=3 | Vacant

|- style="height:2em"
| Elected to finish Bates's term.
| rowspan=8 nowrap | Mar 24, 1845 –Mar 3, 1853
| rowspan=8  | Whig
| rowspan=8 align=right | John Davis
! rowspan=8 | 12

|- style="height:2em"
| 
| rowspan=7 | 11
| rowspan=7 | Re-elected in 1847.Retired.

|- style="height:2em"
| rowspan=4 

|- style="height:2em"
| colspan=3 | Vacant
| nowrap | Jul 23, 1850 –Jul 30, 1850
| Vacant

|- style="height:2em"
! 14
| align=left | Robert Charles Winthrop
|  | Whig
| nowrap | Jul 30, 1850 –Feb 1, 1851
| Appointed to continue Webster's term.Lost election to finish Webster's term.

|- style="height:2em"
! 15
| align=left | Robert Rantoul Jr.
|  | Democratic
| nowrap | Feb 1, 1851 –Mar 3, 1851
| Elected to finish Webster's term.Retired.

|- style="height:2em"
| colspan=3 | Vacant
| nowrap | Mar 4, 1851 –Apr 24, 1851
| rowspan=7 scope=row class=small | The legislature initially deadlocked on who should succeed Daniel Webster. Sumner was eventually elected late.
| rowspan=7 | 12
| rowspan=2 

|- style="height:2em"
! rowspan=16 | 16
| rowspan=16 align=left | Charles Sumner
| rowspan=6  | Free Soil
| rowspan=16 nowrap | Apr 24, 1851 –Mar 11, 1874

|- style="height:2em"
| rowspan=4 
| rowspan=6 | 12
| Elected in 1853.Resigned.
| Mar 4, 1853 –Jun 1, 1854
|  | Whig
| align=right | Edward Everett
! 13

|- style="height:2em"
| Vacant
| Jun 1, 1854 –Jun 3, 1854
| colspan=3 | Vacant

|- style="height:2em"
| Appointed to continue Everett's term.Successor was elected.
| Jun 3, 1854 –Jan 31, 1855
|  | Whig
| align=right | Julius Rockwell
! 14

|- style="height:2em"
| rowspan=3 | Elected to finish Everett's term.
| rowspan=10 nowrap | Jan 31, 1855 –Mar 3, 1873
|  | Free Soil
| rowspan=10 align=right | Henry Wilson
! rowspan=10 | 15

|- style="height:2em"
| 
| rowspan=9  | Republican

|- style="height:2em"
| rowspan=8  | Republican
| rowspan=3 | Re-elected in 1857.
| rowspan=3 | 13
| 

|- style="height:2em"
| 
| rowspan=3 | 13
| rowspan=3 | Re-elected in 1859.

|- style="height:2em"
| 

|- style="height:2em"
| rowspan=3 | Re-elected in 1863.
| rowspan=3 | 14
| 

|- style="height:2em"
| 
| rowspan=3 | 14
| rowspan=3 | Re-elected in 1865.

|- style="height:2em"
| 

|- style="height:2em"
| rowspan=4 | Re-elected in 1869.Died.
| rowspan=6 | 15
| 

|- style="height:2em"
| 
| rowspan=6 | 15
| Re-elected in 1871.Resigned to become the Vice President of the United States.

|- style="height:2em"
| rowspan=2  | Liberal Republican
| rowspan=4 
| Vacant
| nowrap | Mar 3, 1873 –Mar 17, 1873
| colspan=3 | Vacant

|- style="height:2em"
| rowspan=4 | Elected to finish Wilson's term.Lost renomination.
| rowspan=4 nowrap | Mar 17, 1873 –Mar 3, 1877
| rowspan=4  | Republican
| rowspan=4 align=right | George S. Boutwell
! rowspan=4 | 16

|- style="height:2em"
| colspan=3 | Vacant
| nowrap | Mar 12, 1874 –Apr 16, 1874
| Vacant

|- style="height:2em"
! 17
| align=left | William B. Washburn
|  | Republican
| nowrap | Apr 17, 1874 –Mar 3, 1875
| Elected to finish Sumner's term.Retired.

|- style="height:2em"
! rowspan=9 | 18
| rowspan=9 align=left | Henry L. Dawes
| rowspan=9  | Republican
| rowspan=9 nowrap | Mar 4, 1875 –Mar 3, 1893
| rowspan=3 | Elected in 1875.
| rowspan=3 | 16
| 

|- style="height:2em"
| 
| rowspan=3 | 16
| rowspan=3 | Elected in 1877.
| rowspan=14 nowrap | Mar 4, 1877 –Sep 30, 1904
| rowspan=14  | Republican
| rowspan=14 align=right | George Frisbie Hoar
! rowspan=14 | 17

|- style="height:2em"
| 

|- style="height:2em"
| rowspan=3 | Re-elected in 1881.
| rowspan=3 | 17
| 

|- style="height:2em"
| 
| rowspan=3 | 17
| rowspan=3 | Re-elected in 1883.

|- style="height:2em"
| 

|- style="height:2em"
| rowspan=3 | Re-elected in 1887.Retired.
| rowspan=3 | 18
| 

|- style="height:2em"
| 
| rowspan=3 | 18
| rowspan=3 | Re-elected in 1889.

|- style="height:2em"
| 

|- style="height:2em"
! rowspan=18 | 19
| rowspan=18 align=left | Henry Cabot Lodge
| rowspan=18  | Republican
| rowspan=18 nowrap | Mar 4, 1893 –Nov 9, 1924
| rowspan=3 | Elected in 1893.
| rowspan=3 | 19
| 

|- style="height:2em"
| 
| rowspan=3 | 19
| rowspan=3 | Re-elected in 1895.

|- style="height:2em"
| 

|- style="height:2em"
| rowspan=5 | Re-elected in 1899.
| rowspan=5 | 20
| 

|- style="height:2em"
| 
| rowspan=5 | 20
| rowspan=2 | Re-elected in 1901.Died.

|- style="height:2em"
| rowspan=3 

|- style="height:2em"
| Vacant
| nowrap | Sep 30, 1904 –Oct 12, 1904
| colspan=3 | Vacant

|- style="height:2em"
| rowspan=2 | Appointed to continue Hoar's term.Elected to finish Hoar's term.
| rowspan=5 nowrap | Oct 12, 1904 –Mar 3, 1913
| rowspan=5  | Republican
| rowspan=5 align=right | Winthrop M. Crane
! rowspan=5 | 18

|- style="height:2em"
| rowspan=3 | Re-elected in 1905.
| rowspan=3 | 21
| 

|- style="height:2em"
| 
| rowspan=3 | 21
| rowspan=3 | Re-elected in 1907.Retired.

|- style="height:2em"
| 

|- style="height:2em"
| rowspan=3 | Re-elected in 1911.
| rowspan=3 | 22
| 

|- style="height:2em"
| 
| rowspan=3 | 22
| rowspan=3 | Elected in 1913.Lost re-election.
| rowspan=3 nowrap | Mar 4, 1913 –Mar 3, 1919
| rowspan=3  | Republican
| rowspan=3 align=right | John W. Weeks
! rowspan=3 | 19

|- style="height:2em"
| 

|- style="height:2em"
| rowspan=3 | Re-elected in 1916.
| rowspan=3 | 23
| 

|- style="height:2em"
| 
| rowspan=5 | 23
| rowspan=5 | Elected in 1918.Lost re-election.
| rowspan=5 nowrap | Mar 4, 1919 –Mar 3, 1925
| rowspan=5  | Democratic
| rowspan=5 align=right | David I. Walsh
! rowspan=5 | 20

|- style="height:2em"
| 

|- style="height:2em"
| Re-elected in 1922.Died.
| rowspan=6 | 24
| rowspan=3 

|- style="height:2em"
| colspan=3 | Vacant
| nowrap | Nov 9, 1924 –Nov 13, 1924
| Vacant

|- style="height:2em"
! rowspan=2 | 20
| rowspan=2 align=left | William M. Butler
| rowspan=2  | Republican
| rowspan=2 nowrap | Nov 13, 1924 –Dec 6, 1926
| rowspan=2 | Appointed to continue Lodge's term.Lost election to finish Lodge's term.

|- style="height:2em"
| rowspan=2 
| rowspan=4 | 24
| rowspan=4 | Elected in 1924.Retired.
| rowspan=4 nowrap | Mar 4, 1925 –Mar 3, 1931
| rowspan=4  | Republican
| rowspan=4 align=right| Frederick H. Gillett
! rowspan=4 | 21

|- style="height:2em"
! rowspan=14 | 21
| rowspan=14 align=left | David I. Walsh
| rowspan=14  | Democratic
| rowspan=14 nowrap | Dec 6, 1926 –Jan 3, 1947
| rowspan=2 | Elected to finish Lodge's term.

|- style="height:2em"
| 

|- style="height:2em"
| rowspan=3 | Re-elected in 1928.
| rowspan=3 | 25
| 

|- style="height:2em"
| 
| rowspan=3 | 25
| rowspan=3 | Elected in 1930.Retired.
| rowspan=3 nowrap | Mar 4, 1931 –Jan 3, 1937
| rowspan=3  | Democratic
| rowspan=3 align=right | Marcus A. Coolidge
! rowspan=3 | 22

|- style="height:2em"
| 

|- style="height:2em"
| rowspan=3 | Re-elected in 1934.
| rowspan=3 | 26
| 

|- style="height:2em"
| 
| rowspan=3 | 26
| rowspan=3 | Elected in 1936.
| rowspan=4 nowrap | Jan 3, 1937 –Feb 3, 1944
| rowspan=4  | Republican
| rowspan=4 align=right | Henry Cabot Lodge Jr.
! rowspan=4 | 23

|- style="height:2em"
| 

|- style="height:2em"
| rowspan=6 | Re-elected in 1940.Lost re-election.
| rowspan=6 | 27
| 

|- style="height:2em"
| rowspan=4 
| rowspan=6 | 27
| Re-elected in 1942.Resigned to return to active duty in the U.S. Army.

|- style="height:2em"
| Vacant
| nowrap | Feb 4, 1944 –Feb 7, 1944
| colspan=3 | Vacant

|- style="height:2em"
| Appointed to continue Lodge's term.Did not run for election to finish the term.
| Feb 8, 1944 –Dec 19, 1944
|  | Republican
| align=right | Sinclair Weeks
! 24

|- style="height:2em"
| rowspan=3 | Elected to finish Lodge's term.Didn't take seat until Jan 4, 1945 in order to remain Governor of Massachusetts.
| rowspan=15 nowrap | Dec 19, 1944 –Jan 3, 1967
| rowspan=15  | Republican
| rowspan=15 align=right | Leverett Saltonstall
! rowspan=15 | 25

|- style="height:2em"
| 

|- style="height:2em"
! rowspan=3 | 22
| rowspan=3 align=left | Henry Cabot Lodge Jr.
| rowspan=3  | Republican
| rowspan=3 nowrap | Jan 3, 1947 –Jan 3, 1953
| rowspan=3 | Elected in 1946.Lost re-election.
| rowspan=3 | 28
| 

|- style="height:2em"
| 
| rowspan=3 | 28
| rowspan=3 | Re-elected in 1948.

|- style="height:2em"
| 

|- style="height:2em"
! rowspan=4 | 23
| rowspan=4 align=left | John F. Kennedy
| rowspan=4  | Democratic
| rowspan=4 nowrap | Jan 3, 1953 –Dec 22, 1960
| rowspan=3 | Elected in 1952.
| rowspan=3 | 29
| 

|- style="height:2em"
| 
| rowspan=5 | 29
| rowspan=5 | Re-elected in 1954.

|- style="height:2em"
| 

|- style="height:2em"
| Re-elected in 1958.Resigned to become U.S. President.
| rowspan=6 | 30
| rowspan=3 

|- style="height:2em"
| colspan=3 | Vacant
| nowrap | Dec 22, 1960 –Dec 27, 1960
| Vacant

|- style="height:2em"
! rowspan=2 | 24
| rowspan=2 align=left | Benjamin Smith
| rowspan=2  | Democratic
| rowspan=2 nowrap | Dec 27, 1960 –Nov 7, 1962
| rowspan=2 | Appointed to continue John Kennedy's term.Did not run for election to finish the term.

|- style="height:2em"
| rowspan=2 
| rowspan=4 | 30
| rowspan=4 | Re-elected in 1960.Retired.

|- style="height:2em"
! rowspan=26 | 25
| rowspan=26 align=left | Ted Kennedy
| rowspan=26  | Democratic
| rowspan=26 nowrap | Nov 7, 1962 –Aug 25, 2009
| rowspan=2 | Elected to finish his brother's term.

|- style="height:2em"
| 

|- style="height:2em"
| rowspan=3 | Re-elected in 1964.
| rowspan=3 | 31
| 

|- style="height:2em"
| 
| rowspan=3 | 31
| rowspan=3 | Elected in 1966.
| rowspan=6 nowrap | Jan 3, 1967 –Jan 3, 1979
| rowspan=6  | Republican
| rowspan=6 align=right | Edward Brooke
! rowspan=6 | 26

|- style="height:2em"
| 

|- style="height:2em"
| rowspan=3 | Re-elected in 1970.
| rowspan=3 | 32
| 

|- style="height:2em"
| 
| rowspan=3 | 32
| rowspan=3 | Re-elected in 1972.Lost re-election.

|- style="height:2em"
| 

|- style="height:2em"
| rowspan=3 | Re-elected in 1976.
| rowspan=3 | 33
| 

|- style="height:2em"
| 
| rowspan=4 | 33
| rowspan=3 | Elected in 1978.Retired and resigned early to give successor preferential seniority.
| rowspan=3 nowrap | Jan 3, 1979 –Jan 2, 1985
| rowspan=3  | Democratic
| rowspan=3 align=right | Paul Tsongas
! rowspan=3 | 27

|- style="height:2em"
| 

|- style="height:2em"
| rowspan=4 | Re-elected in 1982.
| rowspan=4 | 34
| rowspan=2 

|- style="height:2em"
| Appointed to finish Tsongas's term, having already been elected to the next term.
| rowspan=19 nowrap | Jan 2, 1985 –Feb 1, 2013
| rowspan=19  | Democratic
| rowspan=19 align=right | John Kerry
! rowspan=19 | 28

|- style="height:2em"
| 
| rowspan=3 | 34
| rowspan=3 | Elected in 1984.

|- style="height:2em"
| 

|- style="height:2em"
| rowspan=3 | Re-elected in 1988.
| rowspan=3 | 35
| 

|- style="height:2em"
| 
| rowspan=3 | 35
| rowspan=3 | Re-elected in 1990.

|- style="height:2em"
| 

|- style="height:2em"
| rowspan=3 | Re-elected in 1994.
| rowspan=3 | 36
| 

|- style="height:2em"
| 
| rowspan=3 | 36
| rowspan=3 | Re-elected in 1996.

|- style="height:2em"
| 

|- style="height:2em"
| rowspan=3 | Re-elected in 2000.
| rowspan=3 | 37
| 

|- style="height:2em"
| 
| rowspan=3 | 37
| rowspan=3 | Re-elected in 2002.

|- style="height:2em"
| 

|- style="height:2em"
| rowspan=2 | Re-elected in 2006.Died.
| rowspan=6 | 38
| 

|- style="height:2em"
| rowspan=3 rowspan=4 
| rowspan=8 | 38
| rowspan=6 | Re-elected in 2008.Resigned to become U.S. Secretary of State.

|- style="height:2em"
| colspan=3 | Vacant
| nowrap | Aug 25, 2009 –Sep 24, 2009
| Vacant

|- style="height:2em"
! 26
| align=left | Paul G. Kirk
|  | Democratic
| nowrap | Sep 24, 2009 –Feb 4, 2010
| Appointed to continue Ted Kennedy's term.Did not run for election to finish the term.

|- style="height:2em"
! rowspan=2 | 27
| rowspan=2 align=left | Scott Brown
| rowspan=2  | Republican
| rowspan=2 nowrap | Feb 4, 2010 –Jan 3, 2013
| rowspan=2 | Elected to finish Ted Kennedy's term.Lost re-election.

|- style="height:2em"
| 

|- style="height:2em"
! rowspan=8 | 28
| rowspan=8 align=left | Elizabeth Warren
| rowspan=8  | Democratic
| rowspan=8 nowrap | Jan 3, 2013 –Present
| rowspan=5 | Elected in 2012.
| rowspan=5 | 39
| rowspan=3 

|- style="height:2em"
| Appointed to continue Kerry's term.Did not run for election to finish the term.
| nowrap | Feb 1, 2013 –Jul 16, 2013
|  | Democratic
| align=right | Mo Cowan
! 29

|- style="height:2em"
| Elected to finish Kerry's term.
| rowspan=7 nowrap | Jul 16, 2013 –Present
| rowspan=7  | Democratic
| rowspan=7 align=right | Ed Markey
! rowspan=7 | 30

|- style="height:2em"
| 
| rowspan=3 | 39
| rowspan=3 | Re-elected in 2014.

|- style="height:2em"
| 

|- style="height:2em"
| rowspan=3 | Re-elected in 2018.
| rowspan=3 | 40
| 

|- style="height:2em"
| 
| rowspan=3 | 40
| rowspan=3 | Re-elected in 2020.

|- style="height:2em"
| 

|- style="height:2em"
| rowspan=2 colspan=5 | To be determined in the 2024 election.
| rowspan=2 |41
| 

|- style="height:2em"
| 
| 41
| colspan=5 | To be determined in the 2026 election.

See also

 List of United States representatives from Massachusetts
 United States congressional delegations from Massachusetts
 Elections in Massachusetts

References

 
United States Senators
Massachusetts